Ghazaviyeh-ye Bozorg (also Romanized as Ghazāvīyeh-ye Bozorg and Ghazaviyehe Bozorg; also known as Ghazāvīyeh-ye Seh and Qal‘eh) is a village in Muran Rural District, in the Soveyseh District of Karun County, Khuzestan Province, Iran. At the 2006 census, its population was 1,175, in 217 families.

References 

Populated places in Karun County